Dorothy Healy may refer to:
Dorothy Healy (baseball), All-American Girls Professional Baseball League player
Dorothy M. Healy (1914–1990), professor at Westbrook College and curator of the Maine Women Writers Collection
Dorothy Ray Healey (1914–2006), Communist Party USA activist